Plavnoite is a rare complex uranium sulfate mineral with the formula K0.8Mn0.6[(UO2)2O2(SO4)]•3.5H2O. Typically for the secondary uranium mineral, plavnoite contains uranyl groups. It was discovered in the Plavno mine in Jáchymov, Czech Republic.  The Jáchymov site is known as a type locality for many rare and unique minerals.

Relation to other minerals
Although related to zippeite, plavnoite is chemically unique.

References

Sulfate minerals
Uranium(VI) minerals
Potassium minerals
Manganese(II) minerals
Monoclinic minerals
Minerals in space group 12